Austrodiscus is a fossil genus of medium-sized air-breathing land snails, terrestrial pulmonate gastropods in the family Charopidae.

This genus is known from the Paleocene deposits of the Itaboraí Basin, in the state of Rio de Janeiro, Brazil, although the placement of the species (A. lopesi) in this genus remains uncertain.

Species 
The genus includes the following species:

 A. lopesi Fereira & Coelho, 1989.

References 

Charopidae
Paleocene gastropods